"Duermete Mi Niño" is a Spanish lullaby.

References

Spanish songs
Spanish children's songs
Spanish-language songs
Traditional children's songs
Lullabies
Songwriter unknown
Year of song unknown